Tumbura Airport is an airport serving Tumbura in South Sudan.

Location
Tumbura Airport  is located in Tumbura County in Gbudwe, in the town of Tumbura, near the International borders with the Democratic Republic of the Congo and the Central African Republic. The geographic coordinates of Tumbura Airport are: 5° 36' 0.00" N, 27° 28' 21.00"E (Latitude: 5.6000; Longitude: 27.4725). It has a single unpaved runway, which measures  in length.

Overview
Tumbura Airport is a small civilian airport that serves the town of Tumbura and surrounding communities. There are no scheduled airline flights at Tumbura Airport.

See also
 Tumbura
 Western Equatoria
 Equatoria
 List of airports in South Sudan

References

External links
 Location of Tumbura Airport At Google Maps

Airports in South Sudan
Western Equatoria
Equatoria